Far skal giftes (Father is Going to Get Married) is a 1941 Danish comedy film directed by Lau Lauritzen Jr. and starring Helge Kjærulff-Schmidt.

Cast
Helge Kjærulff-Schmidt as Professor Jacob Jensen
Ellen Gottschalch as Husbestyrerinde Karen Frederiksen
Berthe Qvistgaard as Else Margrethe Jensen
Bodil Kjer as Birthe Jensen
Poul Reichhardt as Oskar Jensen
Maria Garland as Tante Rikke Holm
Eigil Reimers as Harry Holm
Edvin Tiemroth as Peter Larsen
Ib Schønberg as Gartner Ørsager

References

External links

1941 films
1941 comedy films
1940s Danish-language films
Danish black-and-white films
Films directed by Lau Lauritzen Jr.
Danish comedy films